Spaceflight is the act of traveling in outer space.

Spaceflight or Space flight may also refer to:
Spaceflight (magazine), published by the British Interplanetary Society
Spaceflight (TV series), a 1985 American documentary miniseries about crewed spaceflight
CU Spaceflight, a student-run Cambridge University society
Spaceflight Industries, a smallsat rideshare company
Space Flight (album), by Sam Layzar
 Space Flight (video game), about The Phenomenauts
Space travel in science fiction